Dysgonia erectata is a moth of the family Noctuidae first described by George Hampson in 1902. It is found in Africa, including Kenya, South Africa and Zambia.

References

Dysgonia
Moths of Africa
Moths described in 1902